Bhaag D.K. Bose, Aandhi Aayi (English: Run D.K. Bose, The Storm's Here) is a Hindi song composed and sung by Ram Sampath, with lyrics penned by Amitabh Bhattacharya for soundtrack album of the film Delhi Belly. The promotional video of the song, featuring Imran Khan, Vir Das and Kunaal Roy Kapur, has been directed by Sajid Shaikh.

Overview
In the song's lyrics, 'D.K. Bose' appears to be a person's name but it is also a double entendre or Juxtaposition for a Hindi swear word Bhosadi ke (Bhosadi Ke ~ "भोसड़ी के" in Hindi and it literally means "Of the vagina" and holds the same intention as "Cunt") when spoken backward (Bose D. K.). The lyrics were apparently inspired by rants of reality star, Dolly Bindra on Bigg Boss (Season 4), as she regularly used phrases like Bose D.K.

Controversy
The Central Board of Film Certification got into trouble after approving the song in one go even though a section of the people were angry at the obscenity of the lyrics.

Accolades

References

Songs written for films
2011 singles
Indian songs
Hindi film songs
Songs with lyrics by Amitabh Bhattacharya